This is a list of radio stations in Nigeria organized by frequency and location.

States and territories

Federal Capital Territory (FCT)
 87.9 – Best Afro FM
 88.9 – Brila FM
 90.3 – Central FM
 90.9 – Max FM
 92.1 – Vision FM
 92.9 – Kapital FM (FRCN)
 93.5 – Aso Radio
 93.9 – Jordan FM
 97.9 – Beat FM, Abuja
 94.7 – Rhythm FM, Abuja
 94.3 - Classic FM, Abuja
 95.1 – Nigeria Info
 95.5 – Boss FM
 96.1 – Urban Radio
 96.3 – Soundcity Radio, Abuja 
 96.9 – Cool FM, Abuja
 94.3 – Classic FM
 98.3 – Hot FM, Abuja
 98.7 - Bright FM
 99.1 – Nigeria Police Radio
 99.5 – Wazobia FM Abuja
 99.9 – Kiss FM
 100.5 – Raypower, Abuja
 101.1 – Human Rights Radio, Abuja
 102.3 – Eagles FM
 104.5 – Family Love
 105.7 – Greetings FM
 106.3 – WE FM
 106.7 – Nigeria Customs Broadcasting Network
 107.1 – National Traffic Radio
 107.7 – Armed Forces Radio

Abia State
 88.1 – Broadcasting Corporation of Abia State (BCA) Radio, Umuahia
 89.7 – Buzz FM, Aba
 90.9- Gregory FM (GUU)
 93.3 – Rhema FM,

 94.9 – Flo FM, Umuahia
 99.1 – Real FM, Aba
 99.9 – Love FM, Aguiyi Ironsi layout, Umuahia
 101.9 – ABSU FM, Uturu
 102.9 – Magic FM Aba
 103.5 – Pace Setter FM, Amakanma old Umuahia
 104.1 – Vision Africa, Umuahia
 107.1 – Green FM, (MOUAU)

Adamawa State

AM
 917 – AM Radio Gotel, Yola
 1440 – ABC AM, Yola

FM
 89.9  – NAS FM, Yola
 91.1 – FM Gotel Yola
 92.3 – Pulaaku FM, Yola.
 95.7 – ABC FM, Yola
 101.5 – Fombina FM Yola

Akwa ibom state
 90.5 – AKBC
 94.5 – Passion FM
 95.1 – Comfort passion FM
 100.7 – UNIUYO FM (University of Uyo)
 101.1 – Planet FM
 104.5 – Atlantic FM
 104.9 – Heritage FM (Heritage Polytechnic, Eket)
 105.5 – Paradise FM
 105.9 – Inspiration FM
 106.9 – XL FM
 107.5 – Gospel Revolution FM

Anambra State
 88.5 – Anambra Broadcasting Service, Awka
 88.9 – Brila FM, Onitsha
 89.4 – Minaj FM, Obosi
 89.7 – City Radio, Onitsha 
 90.1 – Lumen FM, Uga 
 90.7 – Anambra Broadcasting Service, Onitsha
 91.5 – Blaze FM, Oraifite
 91.9 – Authority FM, Nnewi
 93.3 – Madonna Radio (Madonna University) FM, Okija
 93.7 – Wazobia FM, Onitsha
 94.1 – Unizik (Nnamdi Azikiwe University) FM, Awka
 95.3 – Radio Sapientia FM, Onitsha
 95.7 – Rhythm FM, Awka
 97.8 – Moment FM (Federal Polytechnic Oko), Oko
 98.3 – Ogene FM, Awka
 99.1 – Odenigbo FM, Obosi
 101.7 – Omega FM, Umuchu
 101.9 – Kpakpando FM, Mbaukwu
 102.5 – Purity FM, Awka (FRCN)
 103.5 – Gist FM, Ogidi
 106.1 – Uniojukwu FM, (Chukwuemeka Odumegwu Ojukwu University), Igbariam
 106.5 – Alpha FM, Nnobi
 107.1 – Tansian Radio (Tansian University) FM, Umunya

Online
 Rock FM Nigeria, Nnewi
 Gospel FM, Awka

Bauchi State

AM
 990 kHz- BRC1 AM, Bauchi

FM
 94.6 MHz – BRC2 FM, Bauchi
 95.7 MHz – Raypower, Bauchi
 97.5 MHz – Albarka Radio, Bauchi
 98.5 MHz – Globe FM (FRCN), Bauchi
 99.5 MHz – ATAP FM (ATA Polytechnic), Bauchi

Bayelsa State
 93.1 – People FM, Oxbow Lake Swali, . Yenagoa
 94.7 – Silverbird Rhythm FM, Oxbow Lake Swali, Yenagoa
 95.5 – Royal FM, Agudama-Epie, Yenagoa
 97.1 – Bayelsa State Broadcasting Corporation (BSBC) Glory FM, Radio Bayelsa, Ekeki Yenagoa
 98.1 – Wilberforce Island FM, Ndu Radio
 102.5 – Raypower, Elebele, Yenagoa
 106.5 – Creek FM, Radio Nigeria, Yenagoa

Benue State
 89.9 – Benue State University, BSU FM, Makurdi
 93.3  – Choice FM, Oju
 95.0 – Radio Benue, Makurdi
 96.5 – Joy FM, Otukpo
 98.5 – ASKiNG RADiO Tiv (Online)
 99.9 – Ashiwaves FM, Katsina-Ala
 103.1 – Sun Rays FM, Korinya City, Konshisha
 103.5 – Harvest FM, Makurdi

Borno State
 90.7 – GAME FM
 94.5 – BRTV Borno Radio, Maiduguri
 95.3 – BRTV Metropolitan FM, Maiduguri
 97.7 – Kanem FM (Unimaid Radio)
 98.9_ Dandal Kura Radio, Maiduguri
 99.5 – Freedom Radio, Maiduguri
 102.5 – Peace FM (FRCN)
 108.0 - Lafiya Dole, Maiduguri

Cross River State
 89.7 – CRBC, Ikom
 92.3 – Sparkling FM, Calabar
 92.6 – Cross River Radio
 93.1 – FAD FM, Calabar
 95.9 – Hit FM, Calabar
 97.3 – Correct Fm, Calabar
 99.5 – Canaan City FM, Calabar
 105.5 – CRBC (Paradise) FM, Calabar

Delta State
 83.3 – Demodels Nigeria FM
 88.6 – Melody FM, Warri
 89.9 – Crown FM, Effurun.
 89.1 – Mega FM, Udu, Warri
 93.1 – Quest FM, Ughelli-Patani Road, Ogor
 94.7 – Crown FM, Asaba
 95.1 – JFM, Otu Jeremi
 96.1 – Raypower, Oghara
 96.5 – Hot FM, Asaba
 97.9 – Voice of Delta Radio, Asaba
 98.7 – Bridge Radio, Asaba
 100.5 – Kpoko FM, Warri (Pidgin Broadcast) 
 100.9 – Trend FM, Asaba
 103.7 – Delta State University (Delsu FM), Abraka
 106.7 – Rize FM, Warri

Ebonyi State
 98.1 – Salt FM, Abakaliki
 101.5 – Unity FM, Abakaliki
 104.7 – AE FUNAI FM, Abakaliki
 93.5 – EBSU FM, Abakaliki

Edo State
 88.1 - Super FM Benin
 90.5 – Okada Wonderland FM, (Igbinedion University Radio) Okada
 92.3 – Independent Radio, Benin city
 92.7 – K-U FM, Benin-Auchi road, Benin city
 93.7 – SilverBird Rhythm FM, Ugbowo, Benin city.
 94.1 – Hillside FM (Auchi Polytechnic Radio), Auchi
 94.3 – Izibili FM, Ikpoba Hill
 95.7 – Edo Broadcasting Service, Aduwawa
 96.9 – Speed FM, Benin City
 97.3 – Vibes FM, Benin city
 100.1 – Uniben FM (University of Benin Radio), Benin city
 101.5 – Bronze FM (FRCN), Aduwawa
 105.5 – RayPower FM, Ikhuen Niro, Benin city.

Ekiti State
 89.9 FM – Voice FM, Ado-Ekiti
 91.5 FM – Ekiti FM (BSES), Ilokun, Ado-Ekiti
 92.7 FM – New Cruse FM, Ikere-Ekiti
 95.1 FM – Ayoba FM, Fajuyi, Ado-Ekiti
 100.5 FM – FRCN Progress FM, Iworoko Road, Ado Ekiti
 104.1 FM – Our People's FM, Fajuyi, Ado Ekiti
 106.9 FM – Fresh FM, Falegan, Ado-Ekiti

Enugu State

AM
 828 – Radio Nigeria 1 Enugu Enugu

FM
 91.1 – Soundcity Radio, Enugu
 91.1 – Lion FM (University of Nigeria, Nsukka)
 92.5 – Dream FM, Enugu
 92.9 – Coal City FM (FRCN)
 94.5 – Urban Radio, Enugu
 96.1 – Sunrise FM, Enugu
 96.7 – Voice FM, Nsukka (FRCN)
 98.7 – Caritas University Radio
 99.5 – Owelle FM
 99.9 – Family Love FM, Ngwo, Enugu
 100.9 – Solid FM
 102.9 – Correct FM, Enugu 
 104.9 – Prime sports FM, Enugu
 106.5 – Stallion FM (Federal College of Education, Ehu-Amufu)
 106.5 – ESUT RADIO, Enugu
 106.9 – Gouni FM (Godfrey Okoye University) Radio, Enugu 
 107.2 – IMT RADIO, Enugu

Gombe State

AM
 1404 – Gombe (GMC) AM

FM
 89.1     FUK Campus FM
 91.9 – Gombe (GMC) FM
 92.7 – Vision FM
 93.1 – Raypower FM
 97.3 – Progress Radio FM
 98.1 – Amana radio FM
 103.5 – Jewel (FRCN) FM

Online
Zamani Radio
Naka Sai Naka Radio
Nagari Radio

Imo State
 89.3 – Gold FM, Owerri
 90.1 – Radio Oguta, Oguta
 90.9 – IMSU STAR FM
 92.7 – One Radio
 93.9 – Rock FM, Owerri
 94.1 – Ojemba FM, Owerri. 
 94.5 – Orient FM (Imo Broadcasting Corporation), Owerri 
 97.3 – Megaband FM, Owerri
 98.1 – Groove FM, Owerri
 98.7 – Federal Polytechnic Owerri FM
 99.5 – Hot FM, Owerri
 100.5 – Heartland FM, Owerri
 101.1- My Radio FM, Owerri
 104.9 – The Reach FM
 105.7 – Zanders FM, Owerri
 106.1 – Ojimba FM, Orlu
 107.3 – Darling FM, Owerri
 96.1 – Osiza Radio, Owerri

Online
 Shekinah Radio, Owerri

Jigawa State

AM
 1026MW – Radio Jigawa AM

FM
 93.5 – FM Andaza
 95.5 – Dutse New world FM (JRC)
 95.5 – Radio FM Hadejia (JRC)
 95.5 – Community FM, Birnin Kudu (JRC)
 95.5 – Kazaure Community FM 
 97.5 – FM Radio Kaugama (JRC)
 99.5 – Freedom Radio, Dutse
 100.5 – Horizon FM, Dutse, FRCN
 104.9 - Sawaba FM, Hadejia

Kaduna State

AM
 639 MW – Kada 1 (KSMC)
 747 MW – Nagarta Radio
 594 MW – FRCN (Hausa), Kaduna
 1107 MW – FRCN (English), Kaduna

FM
 88.9 – Brila FM
 89.5 – Hyai FM
 89.9 – Kada 2 FM, Kaduna (KSMC)
 89.9 – Rockside FM, Kafanchan (KSMC)
 90.9 – Capital Sounds FM, Kaduna (KSMC)
 91.7 – Liberty Radio (English), Kaduna
 92.1 – Karama FM, Kaduna (FRCN)
 92.5 — Vision FM, Kaduna
 92.9 – Freedom Radio FM, Kaduna
 93.1 – NUBA FM (Nuhu Bammalli Polytechnic Radio)
 93.7 – FCE Zaria FM
 94.1 – Queen FM, Zaria (KSMC)
 94.3 – Correct FM, Kaduna
 96.1 – Supreme FM, Kaduna (FRCN)
 97.7 – Alheri Radio FM, Kaduna
 98.5 – KASU FM (Kaduna State University Radio)
 98.9 – Invicta FM, Kaduna
 99.9 — Human Right Radio, Kaduna
 101.1— ABU Samaru FM, Zaria
 102.5 – Teachers Radio (Nigeria Institute of Teachers NTI)
 102.7 – Spider FM (Kaduna Polytechnic Radio)
 103.1 – Liberty Radio (Hausa), Kaduna
 106.5 – Raypower, Kaduna

Kano State

AM
 549 – Manoma Radio AM
 729 – Radio Kano I

FM
 88.5 – Dala FM
 89.3 – Radio Kano II FM
 90.3 – Express Radio
 90.7 – ammasco FM
 91.3 – SoundCity FM
 92.3 -- Muhasa FM 
 92.5 – Vision FM Kano 
 93.1 – Arewa Radio
 94.7 – Guarantee Radio
 94.9 -- Gidauniya FM 
 95.1 – Wazobia FM
 96.9 – Cool FM
 97.3 – Rahma Radio
 98.1 – Jalla Radio
 98.5 – Nasara Radio FM
 98.9 – B.U.K FM
 99.5 – Freedom Radio
+ 100.3 _ Hikima FM
 100.7 – Correct FM
 101.1 – ARTV FM
 102.7 – Premier Radio
 103.3 – Liberty Radio Kano
 103.5 – Pyramid FM (FRCN)
 103.9 – Aminci Radio
 104.1 – S-Radio FM
 106.5 – Raypower, Kano

Katsina State

AM
 972 MW – Katsina State Radio, Katsina

FM
 88.9 – Martaba FM, Funtua
 91.5 – Alfijir Radio, Katsina
 92.1 – Vision FM, Katsina
 92.9 - Hamada FM, Katsina
 98.7 - Legend FM, Daura 
 104.5 – Radio Nigeria Companion FM, Katsina (FRCN)
 106.5 – Raypower, Katsina

Kebbi State

AM
 945.0 – Kebbi State Radio,  Birnin kebbi

FM
 Brinkle FM 93.9, Zuru Kebbi
 92.9 – Vision FM, Birnin Kebbi
 103.5 – Equity FM, Birnin Kebbi

Kogi State
 91.7 – Fusion FM, Anyigba (Kogi State University Campus Radio)
 93.5 – Radio Kogi, Otite
 94.0 – Confluence FM, Lokoja
 95.5 – Grace FM, Lokoja
 97.1 – Kogi FM, Egbe
 101.5 – Prime FM (FRCN)
 101.9 – TAO FM, Okene
 102.7 – JATTO FM, Okene

Kwara State

AM
 612.8 – Radio Kwara, Ilorin

FM
 88.7 – Diamond FM Ilorin
 89.3 – Unilorin FM
 89.9 – Albarka FM, Ilorin
 90.9 – Igbomina FM 
 92.5 – O FM, Gaa-Imam Area, Ilorin
 95.1 – Royal FM, Ilorin
 96.3 – SBS FM, Oloje, Ilorin
 99.1 – Midland FM (Radio Kwara), Ilorin
 101.9 – Sobi FM, Ilorin
 102.5 – Tiwa ni Tiwa (TNT) FM, Ijagbo
 103.5 – Harmony FM FRCN (Radio Nigeria), Idofian
 103.9 – Kwasu FM, Malete
 105.7 – Okin FM, G.R.A, Ipee Road, Offa
 106.5 – Raypower FM, Ilorin
 106.7 – Radio Al-Hikmah

Lagos State 
 87.9 – Best Afro FM
 88.9 – Brila FM
 89.3 – Yabatech Radio
 89.7 – Eko FM (Lagos State Radio), Ikeja
 90.1 – Lasgidi FM
 90.3 – VOP FM (Voice of the People Radio), Airport road, Ikeja
 90.9 – Top Radio FM
 91.3 – Lagos Talks FM
 91.7 – WFM 91.7, Lagos
 92.3 – Inspiration FM
 92.9 – Bond FM (FRCN)
 93.3 – Hot Fm, Lagos
 93.7 – Rhythm FM, Lagos
 95.1 – Wazobia FM, Lagos
 95.7 – LASU Radio (Lagos State University Radio), Ojo 
 96.1 – Lagos Traffic Radio
 96.5 – Urban96 FM
 96.9 – Cool FM, Lagos
 97.3 – Classic FM
 97.7 – Metro FM (FRCN)
 98.1 – SMOOTH FM, Lagos 
 98.5 – Soundcity Radio, Lagos
 98.9 – Kiss FM, Lagos
 99.3 – Nigeria Info
 99.7 – Jubilee FM, Igando
 99.9 – The Beat FM, Ikoyi
 100.5 – RayPower FM, Alagbado
 101.5 – Star FM, Ikeja
 102.1 - Hi-Impact FM
 102.3 – Max FM Lagos 
 102.7 – Naija FM
 103.1 – Unilag FM (University of Lagos)
 103.5 – Choice FM (Radio One) (FRCN)
 103.9 – LAW FM Lagos
 104.3 – Correct FM
 104.7 – SMAFM, Lagos
 105.1 – City FM
 105.3 – Fresh FM, Oregun
 105.5 – Jordan FM
 105.9 – NOUN FM (National Open University of Nigeria), Victoria Island
 106.5 – Faaji FM (Raypower FM)
 107.5 – Radio Lagos (Eko FM), Ikeja

Online
 Rock FM Nigeria, Lekki
 Reel Radio, Alimosho (No 1 Music, Lifestyle and Sports Station)

Nasarawa State
 91.1 – Platinum Radio, Keffi
 92.3 – Option FM, Akwanga
 92.5 – NBS, Keffi
 95.9 – Maloney FM, Keffi
 97.1 – Nasarawa Broadcasting Service, Lafia
 99.9 - Breeze FM, Lafia
 101.1 – Nasarawa State University Mass Communication Department FM
 102.5 – Precious FM, Lafia (FRCN)
 108 – Kizito FM

Niger State
 88.5 – Zuma FM, Suleja
 89.1 – Click FM, Lapai (Ibrahim Babangida University Radio)
 89.3 – Standard FM, Bida (The Federal Polytechnic Bida)
 90.1 – Badeggi Radio, Minna
 90.5 – Victory FM, Minna
 91.2 – Crystal Radio, Minna
 91.3 – Crystal Radio, Bida
 91.7 – Prestige FM, Minna
 92.3 – Search FM, Minna (Federal University of Technology Minna Radio)
 100.5 – Power FM, Bida (FRCN)
 103.9 – Ultimate FM, Minna (College of Education Minna Radio)

Ogun State

AM
 603 kHz - OGBC 1, Abeokuta

FM
 87.5 – Arystocratz Radio (AR87.5fm), Cele, Ijebu-ode
 87.9 – Best Afro FM, Abeokuta
 88.1 –  Smash FM Abeokuta, Abiola way, Abeokuta.
 88.5 – Family FM Radio, Abeokuta
 89.1 – Hope FM, Ilisan-Remo (Babcock University Radio)
 89.5 – FUNAAB Radio, Abeokuta (Federal University of Agriculture Abeokuta Radio)
 90.5 – OGBC FM, Abeokuta
 91.7 – Women FM, Arepo, Isheri
 92.1 – OOU FM, Ago-Iwoye (Olabisi Onabanjo University Radio)
 93.1 – Miliki FM, Gudugba, Ewekoro
 94.1 – Rainbow FM
 94.5 – Paramount FM, Abeokuta (FRCN)
 94.7 – Dux FM, Arepo
 95.9 – Hebron FM, Ota (Covenant University Radio)
 96.3 – Super FM, Fatai Agbolade Street, Ijebu-ode
 97.1 – Roots FM, Abeokuta
 97.5 –  Cowry FM, Iyana Oloke, Abeokuta
 101.9 – Rockcity FM, Rockcity Avenue, Asero, Abeokuta
 104.1 – Kennis FM Radio
 104.7 – S.M.A FM, Ikofa, Ijebu-Ode
 106.1 – RCCG Radio, Redemption Camp, Mowe
 106.7 – Splash Fm, Abiola Way Abeokuta
 107.1 – Sweet FM, Ibadan-Abeokuta Expressway, Abeokuta
 107.9 – Fresh FM, Hill Top Gate Abeokuta

Ondo State

FM
 106.1 – Crest FM, Alagbaka, Akure
 88.9 – Adaba FM, Ilara-Mokin, Akure 
 102.9- FRESH FM Opposite school of nursing, Alagbaka GRA,Akure
 90.3 – AAUA Radio, Akungba-Akoko (Adekunle Ajasin University Radio) 
 91.9 – Breez FM, Ijoka, Akure 
 93.1 – Futa FM, Akure (Federal University of Technology Akure Radio)
 93.7 – Ejule-Nen Community Radio, Okitipupa
 94.1 – Awawa FM Ayeka, Okitipupa
 94.5 – Orange FM, Akure
 96.1 – Raypower FM, Oba-ile, Akure
 96.5 – Sunshine FM, Alalaye, Orita-Obele, Akure
 100.1 – Kakaki Ondo Community Radio, Ondo city
 101.9 – SunCity FM Radio, Ondo City.
 100.9 – Eki FM, Ondo city
 102.5 – Positive FM (FRCN)
 104.5 – Empire FM, Akure
 106.5 – Music & Culture FM, Ondo city
 107.3 – Varsity Radio, Akungba-Akoko (Adekunle Ajasin University Radio)

Online
 Adeyemi College of Education Online Radio

Osun State

88.5 -  Diamond FM Ilesha.
 88.3 - Ayekooto FM, Iwo
 89.5 – Orisun FM, Ile-Ife
 90.3 – Tungba FM, Igbajo
 90.9 – Oodua FM, Toll Gate, Ile-Ife 
 91.7 – Rave FM, Oroki Estate, Osogbo
 94.1 – Timsed FM, Oke Agboja, Ijebu Jesha
 94.5 – Great FM, Ile-Ife (Obafemi Awolowo University, OAU Radio) 
 95.1 – Raypower FM, Oke Pupa, Osogbo
 95.5 – Gold FM, Iloko-Ijesa road, Ilesa (FRCN)
 96.3 – Odidere FM, Sky Limit area, Iwo
 101.5 – Crown FM, Eleyele, Ile-Ife
 101.9 – Bowen Radio, Iwo (Bowen University Radio) 
 103.1 – Unique FM, Ara Station, Okesa, Ilesa
 103.5 – Redeemer's FM, Ede (Redeemer's University Radio) 
 104.5 – Living Spring FM, Ile-Awiye, Oke Baale, Osogbo
 104.9 – Fresh FM, Osogbo
 Al Qudus Islamic Internet Radio, Darul Hijirah, Iwo

Online
 Trybe City Radio | Africa's #1 Campus Online Radio Station

Oyo state

AM
 756 kHz – Radio O.Y.O, Ile-Akade Orita Bashorun

FM
 87.7 Omoluabi FM, Alaafia Street, Mokola Hill, Ibadan
 88.1 – Gravity FM, Igboho
 88.7 – Agidigbo FM, Ibadan
 89.1 – Lead City University Campus Radio FM, Ibadan – Lagos Toll Gate, Ibadan
 89.3 – Ogo-Ilu FM, Oko, Ogbomoso (FRCN) 
 89.7 - Prince FM Radio
 90.1 – Space FM, Liberty Road, Ibadan
 90.3 – Brave FM, Igbo-Ile, Ikirun Road, Ogbomosho
 91.1 - Crest FM,Galilee Bus stop, Olodo, Ibadan
 91.5 – Star FM, Secretariat, Ibadan
 92.1 – Ajilete FM, Gambari, Ogbomoso
 92.5 – Impact Business Radio, Akobo, Ibadan
 92.9 – Royal Root FM, Jericho Area, Ibadan
 93.5 – Premier FM, Dugbe, Ibadan (FRCN) 
 93.7 - Vintage FM, Oluyole, Ibadan
 93.9 – Solutions FM, Oke – Bola, Ibadan
 94.9 – 32FM, Cocoa House, Ibadan
 95.1 – Raypower FM, Dugbe, Ibadan
 95.5 – J.FM, Jejelaiye Garden City Area, Saki
 95.7 – Soul FM, Orita Challenge, Ibadan
 96.3 – Oke-Ogun FM, Alaga
 96.7 – Lagelu FM, Felele, Ibadan
 97.9 – Beat FM, Bodija, Ibadan
 98.3 - Blast FM, Ibadan
 98.5 – Oluyole FM, Old Ife Road, Ibadan
 99.1 – Amuludun FM, Moniya, Ibadan
 99.5 – Correct FM, Ibadan 
 100.1 – Jamz FM, Lagelu Estate, Felele Area, Ibadan
 100.5 – Inspiration FM, Osuntokun Avenue, Ibadan
 101.1 – Parrot FM, Kinnira, Ogbomosho
 101.1 – Diamond FM, University of Ibadan, Ibadan
 101.7 – Yes Radio
 101.9 - Tiwantiwaradio, Music House, Challenge Ibadan.
 102.3 – Petals FM, Old Bodija, Ibadan
 102.7 – Naija FM, Bodija, Ibadan
 103.3 - I-flier FM, Ogungbade, Adegbayi, Ibadan
 103.5 – Honor Fm, Ibadan
 103.9 – King Fm, Ibadan
 105.5 – Splash FM, Felele, Ibadan
 105.9 – Fresh FM, Lagos-Ibadan by-pass, Ibadan
 106.3 – Lead Radio, Ibadan.
 106.7 – Pensioners FM, Ibadan
 107.1 – Noble FM, Ibadan
 107.5 – Life Radio, Ibadan

Online
 Spice Radio, Mokola-Sango, Ibadan
 Wellsradio, Ibadan
 Orisun Asa Radio
 Partytrain Radio
 Crystal Radio, Ogbomoso
 JMPBliss Radio, 17 Amole Bye Pass Oke Ado, Ibadan
 Imole Radio & TV, Ogbomoso
 Salt FM online Radio, Ibadan
 Water Radio, Ibadan

Plateau State
 88.65 – Radio Plateau 1 AM 1224, Jos
 90.5 – Peace FM, Jos
 93.3 – Unity FM, Jos
 93.7 – Rhythm FM, Jos
 96.1 – ICEFMUJ (University of Jos)
 98.9 – Rock FM (Plateau Polytechnic)
 100.5 – Raypower FM, Jos
 101.5 – Highland FM, Jos (FRCN) 
 101.9 – Jay FM, Jos
 103.9 – KT FM, Bukuru
 104.3 – Tin City FM, Jos

Rivers State
 88.5 – Uniport Unique FM (University of Port Harcourt)
 89.9 – Garden City FM
 91.1 – Classic Fm Port Harcourt
 91.7 – Wave FM
 92.3 – Nigeria Info
 92.7 – Naija FM, Port Harcourt
 93.3 - Super FM, Port Harcourt
 93.7 – Rhythm FM
 94.1 – Wazobia FM
 95.1 – Today FM
 95.9 – Cool FM
 97.7 – Family Love FM
 98.5 – Treasure FM (FRCN)
 99.1 – Radio Rivers
 99.5 – Wish FM
 99.9 – Beat FM, Port Harcourt
 103.7 – Radio UST FM (University of Science and Technology)
 106.5 – RayPower FM

Online
 Oralvault Radio
 1Radio Port Harcourt

Sokoto State
 91.9 – Caliphate Radio (Nagari FM)
 92.5 – Vision FM
 95.5 – Garkuwa FM
 97.1 – Rima FM
 99.5 – Freedom FM

Taraba State

FM
 88.6 – TSBS Taraba Radio, Mararaba
 90.6 – TSBS Taraba Radio, Jalingo
 97.6 – TSBS Taraba Radio, Serti
 104.5 – Gift FM, Jalingo
 92.5 – Bliss FM, Jalingo
 92.4 - Rock FM, Jalingo
 92.9 - Shinmo FM, Jalingo

Online
 DVC Radio

Yobe State
 89.5 – Yobe broadcasting corporation (YBC), Damaturu
 Sunshine FM 88.1, Potiskum
 Gashua Community Radio

Zamfara State
 103.5 – Pride FM Gusau

See also
 List of newspapers in Nigeria
 List of television stations in Nigeria
 Lists of radio stations in Africa
 Federal Radio Corporation of Nigeria – FRCN
 Music of Nigeria
 Telecommunications in Nigeria

References

External links
 FMLIST database of FM stations (select country "NIG" after logging in or continuing as guest)
 Ecouter Radio En Direct En Ligne database of live Africa radtioio stans
 FMSCAN reception prediction of FM, TV, MW, SW stations (also use the expert options for better results)
 MWLIST worldwide database of MW and LW stations